This article contains lists of notable candidates for the United States Republican Party's 2012 presidential nomination.

Candidates 

The following individuals filed with the Federal Election Commission (FEC) and/or announced their intentions to seek the 2012 presidential nomination of the Republican Party.  In this table, those marked lighter grey were not featured in any televised debates that occurred while their respective campaigns were active; those marked darker grey were excluded from the majority of those same televised debates, but are notable for having debated with at least some of the televised candidates in other forums (usually online).  Candidates with an asterisk after their withdrawal date subsequently sought the nomination of another party.

See results of the 2012 Republican Party presidential primaries for more details about the outcome of the primaries.

Nominee

Did not withdraw

Withdrew after the primaries

Appeared on more than two primary ballots

Suspended or withdrew before the primaries, but appeared on at least three primary ballots

Appeared on only two primary ballots

Appeared on only one primary ballot

Sarah Gonzalez (AZ)
Paul Sims (AZ)
Al Perry (AZ)
Cesar Cisneros (AZ)
Kevin Rubash (NH)
Donald Benjamin (AZ)
Michael Levinson (AZ)
Kip Dean (AZ)
Ronald Zack (AZ)

Jeff Lawman (NH)
Frank Lynch (AZ) 
Wayne Arnett (AZ)
Raymond Perkins (AZ)
Matt Welch (AZ) 
Benjamin Linn (NH)
Jim Terr (AZ)	
Charles Skelley (AZ)
Simon Bollander (AZ)
 
Joe Story (NH)
Bear Betzler (NH)
Joe Robinson (NH)
Linden Swift (NH)
Timothy Brewer (NH)
Vern Wuensche (NH)
Hugh Cort (NH)
James Vestermark (NH)

Filed with the FEC, but appeared on no primary ballots

Formed exploratory committee but did not run

Speculative candidates

Received speculation

The following people were the object of presidential speculation in media reports in 2011. This gallery does not include people who declined to run (see below).

Declined to run

The following people, who were speculated to be potential candidates for the Republican Party's presidential nomination clearly and unequivocally denied interest publicly, released Shermanesque statements, or declared candidacy for a different political office in 2012.

See also
2012 Republican Party presidential primaries
Prelude to the 2012 Republican Party presidential primaries
2012 Republican Party presidential debates and forums
Statewide opinion polling for the 2012 Republican Party presidential primaries
2012 Democratic Party presidential candidates
Third party and independent candidates for the 2012 United States presidential election
2012 United States presidential election timeline

References

External links
2012 Presidential Form 2 Filers at the Federal Election Commission (FEC)
Debate Statistics from the 2012 Presidential Election